Strumaria tenella is a species of flowering plant in the family Amaryllidaceae, native to Lesotho, and the Cape Provinces and Free State of South Africa. It was first described by Carl Linnaeus the Younger in 1782 as Crinum tenellum. Its inflorescence of white flowers has been described as "noticeably starry".

Subspecies
Two subspecies are recognized:
Strumaria tenella subsp. orientalis Snijman is the only Strumaria taxon from the summer rainfall area in the east of southern Africa – all the others, including subsp. tenella, are from the more western winter rainfall area. It has a larger swelling at the base of the style than subsp. tenella.
Strumaria tenella subsp. tenella

References

tenella
Flora of the Cape Provinces
Flora of the Free State
Flora of Lesotho
Plants described in 1782
Taxa named by Carl Linnaeus the Younger